The Iwokrama International Centre for Rain Forest Conservation and Development is an autonomous non-profit institution established by Guyana and the Commonwealth.  It "exists to promote the conservation and the sustainable and equitable use of tropical rain forests in a manner that leads to lasting ecological, economic, and social benefits to the people of Guyana and to the world in general, by undertaking research, training, and the development and dissemination of technologies".

It started in 1989 as a gift to the Commonwealth by late president Desmond Hoyte, and the Iwokrama Act signed by late President Cheddi Jagan in 1996 officially established the center.

The Center manages the Iwokrama Forest in central Guyana to show how tropical forests can be conserved and sustainably used to provide ecological, social and economic benefits to local, national and international communities. The forest has an area of 3710 km² (1432 mile²).

Iwokrama Centre offers compensation in the form of capital to residents of surrounding communities. One third of incomes provided by Iwokrama employment exceed Guyana’s poverty threshold of $282. Financial (or other) compensation for residents can be integral to continued community support of conservation initiatives, and can reduce the likelihood of locals leaving in search of other work in mines or other enterprises in the country.

Iwokrama builds partnerships with local communities and the private sector. These partnerships combine traditional knowledge, science and business to develop "green", socially responsible and sustainable forest products and services, like low-impact timber harvesting, ecotourism, training forest rangers and guides, and harvesting aquarium fish. Businesses provide local and national benefits, and so help maintain international biodiversity and climate. Prince Charles has been a patron of the centre since 2000. The centre also works with the University of Guyana's science programme with a focus on biodiversity.

Iwokrama evaluates the social, economic and ecological changes that occur as a result of business development. The objective is to become a model for business development that results in the worldwide conservation of tropical forests.

Despite conservation efforts, illegal logging and mining threatens the area. Under the Iwokrama Act, illegal operations can result in a fine of up to GYD $100,000 or imprisonment for a period of one year.

References

Nature conservation in Guyana
Science and technology in Guyana
Forest conservation organizations
Guyana